The 2008–09 Austrian Football First League was the 35th season of second-level football in Austria, since its introduction in 1974.

SC Wiener Neustadt, which bought the league license of SC Schwanenstadt along with most of their players at the end of the 2007–08 season due to the latter's insolvency, won the First League championship and were promoted to the 2009–10 Bundesliga. Three teams were relegated to the Regional Leagues. SV Grödig and 1. FC Vöcklabruck sealed their fate based upon competitive criteria, while DSV Leoben did not apply for a professional license and thus were automatically demoted.

Schedule
Every team played each other three times. The season started on 11 July 2008 and finished on 29 May 2009. Between 29 November 2008 and 6 March 2009, no matches were played due to winter break.

FC Wacker Innsbruck had been relegated from the 2007–08 Austrian Football Bundesliga. The teams promoted from the Regional Leagues had been SV Grödig (West), 1. FC Vöcklabruck (Central) and SKN St. Pölten (East).

Standings

Season statistics

Top scorers
Final standings; Source: bundesliga.at

See also
 2008–09 Austrian Football Bundesliga
 2008–09 Austrian Cup

External links
 soccerway.com

2. Liga (Austria) seasons
Austria
2008–09 in Austrian football

de:Österreichische Fußballmeisterschaft 2008/09#Erste Liga